Bolton Pride is an annual Pride event celebrating LGBTQIA+ life in Bolton, Greater Manchester, England, and was first held in 2015. The event includes a parade through the town and live music in the town centre.

History
The first Bolton Pride was founded in 2015 by James Edgington and Liz Pycroft. The creation of the event was partly a reaction to the release of statistics in early 2015 which showed that hate crime against LGBT people in Bolton had increased 135% in the previous year. The aim was to encourage Bolton to become more LGBT friendly and used the slogan "Love Bolton, hate homophobia". Ian McKellen was guest of honour at the first Bolton Pride, which was held in October. 

For Bolton Pride's second year a parade was introduced and continued the ‘Love Bolton, hate homophobia’ theme. It took place from 23 to 25 September 2016 and included a candle-lit vigil to commemorate victims of hate crime.

Bolton Pride 2017 was held on the weekend of 30 September and 1 October. It featured a candlelit vigil, an LGBT film night, and live music. The parade featured around 500 people with floats.
Bolton Pride 2018 took place on 21–23 September. It consisted of a vigil, stalls in the market and Victoria Square, and a parade themed around The Greatest Showman and finishing in Victoria Square,

Bolton Pride 2019 was held over three days from 20 September to 22 September. The event was organised by volunteers from across Bolton and the surrounding areas. The festival weekend began on Friday 20 September 2019 with a Bolton FM street party in the afternoon with the Town Hall being highlighted in the colours of the rainbow flag in the evening. On Saturday 21 September 2019, there was a parade from Queen’s Park to Victoria Square where there was live entertainment in Victoria Square until early evening with evening events at local venues – The Alma Inn and The Venue. On the final day, Sunday 22 September 2019, there was a Family Fun Day with activities, entertainment, and, stalls from local charities, community groups and businesses in Victoria Square and the Market Place. 

The event was cancelled in 2020 and 2021 due to the COVID-19 pandemic. It returned in person in August 2022. In spring of 2022 Edgington, one of the co-founders, stepped down and appointed Kevin Wright as the event's new director.

Awards 
Each year, Bolton Pride holds the Diversity Awards to recognise work supporting the LGBT community in Bolton.

in 2017, Bolton Pride won the Tell MAMA Award at the #No2H8 Crime Awards for their role in dealing with hate crime.

References

External links

"Bolton Pride Wins the Tell MAMA Hate Crime Award at the No2H8 Crime Awards – 2017" via YouTube

Pride parades in England
Bolton
LGBT organisations in England
LGBT culture in England